Iowa Hawkeyes
 
 
 

Royce Alger (born 1965) is an American wrestler and retired mixed martial artist. A student of wrestling icon Dan Gable, he went on to become a three-time All-American, three-time Big Ten champion, and two-time NCAA National Champion at the 167 and 177 pound weight classes in 1987 and 1988, at the University of Iowa. After going undefeated in his final 78 matches, Alger spent seven years as an assistant wrestling coach with his alma mater. He was also a World silver medalist in freestyle wrestling at the 1990 World Wrestling Championships.

Alger later competed in mixed martial arts. In his debut at UFC 13 on May 30, 1997, he lost by armlock to Enson Inoue. He won his next three fights, all of which were in smaller, regional MMA events. In his fifth and final fight at UFC 21 on July 16, 1999, he was knocked out by Eugene Jackson.

Mixed martial arts record

|-
|Loss
|align=center|3–2
|Eugene Jackson
|KO (punch)
|UFC 21
|
|align=center|2
|align=center|1:19
|Cedar Rapids, Iowa, United States
|
|-
|Win
|align=center|3–1
|Roberto Ramirez
|TKO (punches)
|Iowa Cage Fighting 1
|
|align=center|1
|align=center|4:48
|Iowa, United States
|
|-
|Win
|align=center|2–1
|Craig Pumphrey
|TKO (punches)
|Extreme Challenge 10
|
|align=center|1
|align=center|4:15
|Des Moines, Iowa, United States
|
|-
|Win
|align=center|1–1
|Joe DeFuria
|Submission (americana)
|Extreme Challenge 9
|
|align=center|1
|align=center|1:24
|Davenport, Iowa, United States
|
|-
|Loss
|align=center|0–1
|Enson Inoue
|Technical Submission (armbar)
|UFC 13
|
|align=center|1
|align=center|1:36
|Augusta, Georgia, United States
|

References

External links
 Royce Alger at the National Wrestling Hall of Fame site*
 
 

1965 births
Living people
American male sport wrestlers
American male mixed martial artists
Mixed martial artists utilizing collegiate wrestling
Mixed martial artists utilizing freestyle wrestling
World Wrestling Championships medalists
Iowa Hawkeyes wrestlers
Ultimate Fighting Championship male fighters